The cantons of Saint-Denis are administrative divisions of Réunion, an overseas department and region of France. Since the French canton reorganisation which came into effect in March 2015, the city of Saint-Denis is subdivided into 4 cantons. Their seat is in Saint-Denis.

Cantons

References

Cantons of Réunion